Oroetus, or Oroetes  (Old Iranian: Arvita, Ancient Greek: Ὀροίτης), was a Persian Satrap of Lydia (c. 530-520 BC), during the reigns of Cyrus the Great, Cambyses and Darius the Great, succeeding Harpagus, and being followed by Bagaeus. He is described by Herodotus in the third book of his Histories, where he achieved notoriety for the death of Polycrates, tyrant of Samos:

 

Oroetus became the first satrap recorded as demonstrating insubordination towards the central power of Persia. When Cambyses (ruled 530-522 BC), who succeeded his father Cyrus, died, the Persian Empire was in chaos prior to Darius the Great (522-486 BC) finally securing control. Oroetus defied Darius' orders to assist him, whereupon the Achaemenid nobleman Bagaeus was sent by Darius to arrange his murder.

Oroetus in Art

Sources 
 Jona Lendering. Oroetus
 From Cyrus to Alexander: A History of the Persian Empire, Pierre Briant, Eisenbrauns: 2002, 

6th-century BC Iranian people
Achaemenid satraps of Lydia
Officials of Cyrus the Great
Officials of Darius the Great
520s BC deaths